Venceremos (Spanish for "We will be victorious") was an American far-left and primarily Chicano political group active in the Palo Alto, California area from 1969 to 1973.

History 
The organization was founded in 1966 by Aaron Manganiello as a largely Latino left-wing group; it evolved to an increasingly Maoist/Communist brigade. Katerina Del Valle was its chairperson. In 1971 they were joined by a faction of the Maoist organization Revolutionary Union (RU), led by H. Bruce Franklin, a Stanford University English professor. More whites joined the organization through this period. Franklin was fired in 1972 on charges of violating his commitment to the university by "inciting to riot" in 1971.  

Venceremos and Franklin favored a militant strategy based on protracted urban guerrilla warfare. According to Franklin, "... these collectives had been heavily involved in youth organizing within white proletarian communities, in factory organizing and in anti-imperialist struggles on the campuses. [...] The new combined organization was multi-national, extremely diversified in its activities and base, and quite militant."

Venceremos publicly advocated armed self-defense by the citizenry, community control of the police, and reform of the prison system. To these ends, the group's members engaged in a number of legal activities, such as working to educate prisoners and defend Vietnam War protesters. The organization's ultimate stated goal was the overthrow of the government. In 1970, Venceremos opened its own community college in a Redwood City storefront; it operated for two years until running out of money. The United States government considered Venceremos a serious political threat, as described in the 202-page House Committee on Internal Security report America's Maoists: the Revolutionary Union, the Venceremos Organization (1972).

Venceremos members often participated in City Council and School Board meetings in Palo Alto with a verbal aggressiveness rarely seen before in the city's politics. Member Jeffrey Youdelman was known for offensive shouting down of council members and presenting petitions for radical left causes. Venceremos members ran for local office in Palo Alto, including Jean Hobson and Youdelman who unsuccessfully ran for City Council in 1971 and 1973, respectively. Doug Garrett ran for the School Board. 

During this period, Venceremos held weekly rallies at Lytton Plaza in Palo Alto, which they dubbed "The People's Plaza." In May 1971, Venceremos's Easter Division drifted away from the center and began organizing through the United Farm Workers union.

A small group of Venceremos members attempted to free a federal prisoner on October 6, 1972; several members were involved in the murder, which hit the headlines. Member Jean Hobson had been romantically linked to federal prison inmate Ronald Beaty, who was incarcerated at Chino Prison. She and other Venceremos members made a plan to gain Beaty's escape. According to police and Beaty, who became the prosecution's star witness, two unarmed prison guards were taking Beaty to a court appearance in San Bernardino when their vehicle was ambushed near Chino. Beaty was freed when Venceremos member, 23-year-old Robert Seabok, shot both guards at point blank range, killing Jesus Sanchez and wounding his partner George Fitzgerald.

After the police captured Beaty and Hobson nearly a month later, Beaty named Venceremos members Hobson, Seabok, Andrea Holman Burt, and Benton Burt as the perpetrators of the fatal assault on the prison guards. Former professor H. Bruce Franklin, four Venceremos members, and three Arizona residents were arrested in this case in late December 1972. A total of fourteen people were arrested; twelve were charged either with murder or, as was Franklin, with harboring Beaty, classified as a federal fugitive. 

While charges were dropped against some, the chief perpetrators were tried. Jean Hobson, 19 year-old Andrea Holman Burt, and her husband 31-year-old Douglas Burt were all convicted of second-degree murder in 1973 and 1974. Seabok was convicted of first-degree murder and sentenced to life imprisonment. Beaty had become a prosecution witness; he pleaded guilty for being part of Sanchez's death and was sentenced to life as well. By September 1973 Venceremos had officially disbanded. Some members went on to other leftist groups, such as Joe Remiro, who joined the small Symbionese Liberation Army in its early days.

Aftermath 
Venceremos disintegrated under the duress of legal troubles, recriminations over the Beaty incident, and general factionalism. By September 1973 it had ceased to function as an organization. Robert Seabok was convicted of first degree murder; while Jean Hobson, Andrea Holman Burt, and Benton Burt were convicted of second degree murder. 

In March 1973, far-left militant Donald DeFreeze escaped from Soledad Prison and made his way to Oakland. He found shelter with members or associates of Venceremos at the Peking House commune, but members were concerned about police surveillance. They moved DeFreeze to a lower-profile location east of the hills in Concord. Calling himself General Field Marshal Cinque, he co-founded the Symbionese Liberation Army with Patricia Soltysik, a white woman, and a few mostly white associates he met as a prisoner and member of the Black Cultural Association at Vacaville Prison. 

The Communist Party USA (Provisional) also traces its origins to the 1973 split within Venceremos.

See also
 Chicano Movement
 New Communist Movement
 Symbionese Liberation Army
National Labor Federation

References

External links

Venceremos at the Encyclopedia of Anti-Revisionism Online

Far-left politics in the United States
Left-wing militant groups in the United States
Defunct Maoist organizations in the United States
COINTELPRO targets
1969 establishments in California
1973 disestablishments in California